West Branch River John is a community in the Canadian province of Nova Scotia, located in  Pictou County .

References
West Branch River John on Destination Nova Scotia

Communities in Pictou County
General Service Areas in Nova Scotia